The 2022 World Wrestling Championships was the 17th edition of the World Wrestling Championships of combined events and was held between 10 and 18 September 2022 in Belgrade, Serbia. After Frank Chamizo, wrestling for Italy in the men's freestyle 74 kg category, was found to be doping, the bronze medal was given to Soner Demirtaş of Turkey.

The UWW Bureau approved the candidature of Belgrade, Serbia as the host of the 2023 Senior World Championships. However, due to the restrictions on Russia for hosting World Championships in 2021–2022, Belgrade replaced the former city of Krasnoyarsk as the World Championships host for 2022. For 2023 the World Championships host will be reallocated to Russia. In addition, Russian and Belarusian athletes have been banned from 2022 World Championships.

Competition schedule
All times are (UTC+2:00)

Medal table

Team ranking

Medal summary

Men's freestyle

Men's Greco-Roman

Women's freestyle

Participating nations 
745 wrestlers from 75 countries:

  (2)
  (4)
  (3)
  (14)
  (2)
  (4)
  (24)
  (11)
  (12)
  (20)
  (1)
  (1)
  (3)
  (29)
  (4)
  (9)
  (4)
  (1)
  (5)
  (1)
  (12)
  (5)
  (3)
  (3)
  (6)
  (4)
  (5)
  (3)
  (15)
  (3)
  (20)
  (23)
  (3)
  (5)
  (19)
  (30)
  (20)
  (5)
  (13)
  (2)
  (29)
  (30)
  (1)
  (15)
  (25)
  (3)
  (9)
  (18)
  (12)
  (20)
  (5)
  (1)
  (3)
  (5)
  (1)
  (20)
  (1)
  (5)
  (15)
  (2)
  (2)
  (12) (Host)
  (6)
  (6)
  (7)
  (1)
  (2)
  (3)
  (1)
  (30)
  (30)
  (30)
  (25)
  (7)
 UWW (1)

References

External links
 Results Book
 Official website

World Wrestling Championships
2022 in Serbian sport
World Championships
World Wrestling Championships
International wrestling competitions hosted by Serbia